Cassard may refer to:

 Jacques Cassard (1679–1740), French privateer and naval officer
 Philippe Cassard (born 1962), French classical pianist
 Stéphane Cassard (1972– ), French footballer
 French ship Cassard, the name of several French Navy ships